McCleave is a surname. Notable people with the surname include:

 Dave McCleave (1911–1988), English boxer
 Robert McCleave (1922–2004), Canadian journalist, editor, judge, lawyer and politician
 William McCleave (1825–1904), Irish-born United States Army officer